The Cabin Sydney is an outpatient addiction treatment clinic. The facility has been recognized as the first multinational addiction treatment provider in Australia. The Cabin Sydney is an affiliate of The Cabin Addiction Services Group. The Cabin Addiction Services Group also owns The Cabin Chiang Mai inpatient rehab. The Cabin Sydney opened in July 2015 and is located in Sydney, Australia. In July 2016, The Cabin Sydney completed a study which found that 70% of crystal methamphetamine addicts required rehabilitation rather than jail. The Cabin Addiction Services Group also operates the Cabin Melbourne.

References

Companies based in Sydney
Addiction organisations in Australia
Drugs in Australia
Medical and health organisations based in Australia
Health care companies established in 2015
Australian companies established in 2015